Muea is a village in Buea Subdivision of Fako Division  in the Southwest Region of Cameroon.

Overview 
Muea is a chiefdom in the Buea Council Area (Buea Subdivision).

Notable institutions 
Presbyterian Church
St. Andrew Catholic Church
G.B.H.S Muea
C.M.A Muea (Hospital)

Places 
Muea Market

References 

Populated places in Cameroon